The Batang Kali Komuter station is a Malaysian commuter train station stationed at the northwest of and named after the town of Batang Kali, Hulu Selangor, Selangor. The station was opened on April 21, 2007, alongside the Rasa and Serendah stations.

It was the second stop in the Rawang-Tanjung Malim shuttle service (formerly known as the Rawang-Kuala Kubu Bharu shuttle service) until the service merged with the Port Klang Line in 2016.

The station, as are all the other stations along the shuttle route (except the Tanjung Malim Komuter station), is situated along two railways, each assigned with one platform like most station halts along KTM Komuter lines, but contains facilities normally reserved for medium-to-large stations along three or more lines. In addition to ticketing facilities and basic amenities, the station contains spaces for administrative occupants, as well as a "kiosk" and an additional foot bridge (fused with a foot bridge exclusively for Komuter users) for pedestrians that simply intend to cross the railway lines. The station also includes low-tech support for disabled passengers. The station exits southeast towards a road that passes through Batang Kali.

The Batang Kali station's two side platforms are designated as platform 1 (adjoining the main station building at the east, intended for southbound trains) and platform 2 (at the west, intended for northbound trains).

See also

 Seremban Line

References

 

Hulu Selangor District
Rawang-Seremban Line
Railway stations in Selangor
Rapid transit stations in Selangor
2007 establishments in Malaysia